The Hotel Savoy, at 409 State St. in Santa Barbara, California, was built in 1889 as Faith Mission.  It was designed by architect Peter J. Barber in Stick/Eastlake and Italianate architectural styles.  It was listed on the National Register of Historic Places in 1982.

It has served as a religious structure and as a hotel, and was listed for its architecture.

It was deemed notable because of its "elaborate stamped metal facade decorations", unique in southern Santa Barbara County, and as it is possibly the last 19th-century commercial building in Santa Barbara surviving with its original facade intact.

References

External links  
 Article about the building at Santa Barbara Independent

Buildings and structures in Santa Barbara, California
Churches completed in 1889
Hotels established in 1889
19th-century churches in the United States
Hotel buildings on the National Register of Historic Places in California
National Register of Historic Places in Santa Barbara County, California
Churches on the National Register of Historic Places in California
Italianate architecture in California
Stick-Eastlake architecture in California
Italianate church buildings in the United States